Mohan Rawale (9 December 1948 – 19 December 2020) was a member of the 14th Lok Sabha of India. He represented the Mumbai South Central constituency of Maharashtra and was a member of the Shiv Sena (SS) political party before Shiv Sena party leader Uddhav Thackeray expelled him from the party in an apparent clamp down on dissidence. He joined the Nationalist Congress Party but soon after rejoined the Shiv Sena.

He was born in Parel, Mumbai. He got married on 21 December 1986 to Indira Mohan Rawale and had a son and a daughter.

Positions held
 1979–1984 – President, Bharatiya Vidyarthi Sena, Maharashtra
 1991 – Elected to 10th Lok Sabha
 1996 – Elected to 11th Lok Sabha
 1998 – Elected to 12th Lok Sabha
 1999 – Elected to 13th Lok Sabha
 2004 – Elected to 14th Lok Sabha
 2009 – Lost from Mumbai South

External links
A brief biographical sketch of Mr. Mohan Rawale on the Parliament of India's website

2020 deaths
1948 births
People from Maharashtra
India MPs 1991–1996
India MPs 1996–1997
India MPs 1998–1999
India MPs 1999–2004
India MPs 2004–2009
Marathi politicians
Shiv Sena politicians
Politicians from Mumbai
Lok Sabha members from Maharashtra